This is a list of Republican National Conventions. The quadrennial convention is the presidential nominating convention of the Republican Party of the United States.

List of Republican National Conventions 

Note: Conventions whose nominees won the subsequent presidential election are shaded in pink.

 
*Won the election despite losing the popular vote.  
1This convention was known as the National Union Convention.

2This convention was known as the National Union Republican Convention.

3Sherman, who had been elected Vice President in 1908, died six days before the 1912 election; he was subsequently replaced as Republican Vice-presidential nominee by Nicholas M. Butler of New York.

4Originally scheduled for the San Diego Sports Arena in San Diego, California and for August 14–16.

5Originally scheduled for the Spectrum Center in Charlotte, North Carolina, but the venue was changed due to the COVID-19 pandemic.

Keynote speakers
1884 – U.S. Representative John R. Lynch of Mississippi (thought to be the first keynote speaker)
1916 – U.S. Senator Warren G. Harding of Ohio
1920 – U.S. Senator Henry Cabot Lodge of Massachusetts
1924 – U.S. Representative Theodore Burton of Ohio
1928 – U.S. Senator Simeon Fess of Ohio
1932 – U.S. Senator Lester Dickinson of Iowa
1936 – U.S. Senator Frederick Steiwer of Oregon
1940 – Governor Harold Stassen of Minnesota
1944 – Governor Earl Warren of California
1948 – Governor Dwight Green of Illinois
1952 – General Douglas MacArthur of Wisconsin
1956 – Governor Arthur Langlie of Washington
1960 – U.S. Representative Walter Judd of Minnesota
1964 – Governor Mark Hatfield of Oregon
1968 – Governor Daniel Evans of Washington
1972 – RNC Co-Chair Anne Armstrong of Texas
1976 – U.S. Senator Howard Baker of Tennessee
1980 – U.S. Representative Guy Vander Jagt of Michigan
1984 – U.S. Treasurer Katherine Ortega of New Mexico
1988 – Governor Thomas Kean of New Jersey
1992 – U.S. Senator Phil Gramm of Texas
1996 – U.S. Representative Susan Molinari of New York
2000 – No officially designated keynote speaker; U.S. Senator John McCain of Arizona and General Colin Powell of Virginia were featured speakers.
2004 – U.S. Senator Zell Miller of Georgia (a Democrat, Miller is first speaker from the opposite party to address a national convention as keynoter)
2008 – Mayor Rudy Giuliani of New York
2012 – Governor Chris Christie of New Jersey
2016 – No officially designated keynote speaker; multiple "headliners" each night
2020 - Patricia and Mark McCloskey of Missouri

Gallery of convention sites

See also
 Bibliography of the Republican Party
 List of United States Republican Party presidential tickets
 List of presidential nominating conventions in the United States
 List of Democratic National Conventions
 List of Whig National Conventions
 U.S. presidential election
 U.S. presidential primary

References

External links
 Republican Party platforms at The American Presidency Project
 Republican Party candidate nomination speeches at The American Presidency Project

National Conventions